Stylos is an archaeological site of an ancient Minoan settlement and cemetery near the modern village of Stylos on the Greek island of Crete.  Stylos means "column" in Greek. Stylos is near the important archaeological site of Aptera in Chania regional unit. The site was first excavated by N. Platon and C. Davaras. A potter's kiln, a building with four rooms and a Late Minoan tholos tomb have been excavated.

References
 Swindale, Ian "Stylos" Retrieved 12 May 2013.

External links
 http://www.minoancrete.com/stylos.htm - Excellent photographs and video of the site.

Chania (regional unit)
Ancient Greek archaeological sites in Crete
Minoan sites in Crete
Populated places in ancient Greece
Former populated places in Greece
Beehive tombs